

Heinrich Kittel (31 October 1892 – 5 March 1969) was a German general during World War II who commanded the 462nd Infantry Division. As a prisoner of war, he was interned at Trent Park, where his conversations with fellow inmates were surreptitiously recorded by the British intelligence.

Appointed commander of the 462nd Infantry Division on 8 November 1944, he led it during the Battle of Metz until his wounding in action on 22 November 1944. Made a prisoner of war when the field hospital he was in was overrun by American forces, he was held in captivity until 1947.

According to a review of Soldaten: Secret WWII Transcripts of German POWs by Sönke Neitzel and Harald Welzer, Kittel's transcripts (in conversation with another POW) illustrate his culpable passivity while observing mass executions without intervening at all despite his rank: "Kittel (very excited): 'They seized three-year-old children by the hair, held them up and shot them with a pistol and then threw them in. I saw that for myself. One could watch it; the SD [Sicherheitsdienst, the Security Service of the SS] had roped the area off and the people were standing watching from about 300 m. off. The Latvians and the German soldiers were just standing there, looking on'." Kittel, according to the reviewer, ignobly, perhaps criminally, failed to act, despite the [reviewer's] presumption that his high rank could have enabled him to do so.

Awards and decorations

 Knight's Cross of the Iron Cross on 12 August 1944 as Generalmajor and combat commander of Lemberg

References

 

1892 births
1969 deaths
People from Gerolzhofen
People from the Kingdom of Bavaria
German Army personnel of World War I
Military personnel from Bavaria
Recipients of the Gold German Cross
Recipients of the Knight's Cross of the Iron Cross
Recipients of the Order of the Cross of Liberty, 1st Class
German prisoners of war in World War II held by the United States
Lieutenant generals of the German Army (Wehrmacht)
Recipients of the clasp to the Iron Cross, 1st class
German Army generals of World War II